Patdi is a town and former princely state on the Saurashtra peninsula in Gujarat, western India.

History 
Patdi used to be an estate in  prant of Eastern Kathiawar.

Ruling Desai Patel Shris 
 .... - ....      Bhamjibhai
 .... - ....      Udekaramji 
 .... - ....      Bhavsimhji 
 .... - 1796      Nathubhai 
 1796 - 1809      Vakhatsimji Nathubhai  
 1809 - ....      Harisimhji 
 .... - ....      Arbhamji Harisimhji
 .... - ....      Kubersimji Vakhatsimhji 
 1848 - 1875      Jorawarsimhji
 1875 - 1884      Himmatshimji Jorawarsimhji 
 10 July 1884 - 5 August 1913 Surajmalji Jorawarsimhji     (b. 1848 - d. 1913) 
 5 August 1913 – 25 Oct 1928  Daulatsimhji Surajmalji      (b. 1881 - d. 1928) 
 25 Oct 1928 – 2 Jan 1940  Raghuvirsimhji Daulatsimhji     (b. 1926 - d. 1940) 
 2 Jan 1940 – 17 Dec 1941  Naransimhji Chandrasimhji       (b. 1873 - d. 1941) 
 17 Dec 1941 - 15 August 1947 Pratapsimhji Naransimhji     (b. 1895 - d. 1978)

Economy 
The main business of Patdi is salt production and related products. It provides a salt transportation channel to India. 
Patdi provides the best market for the consumer needs of neighbouring villages. It also provides a farmers' market and cotton processing units.

Transport 
The town is located 90 km west of Ahmedabad in Ahmedabad district with a population of approximately 20,000. Ahmedabad International Airport is the nearest airport, located 90 km away. Patdi has a lesser frequency of train connections. The nearest station having enough trains is Viramgam (30 km).

Patdi town is on the edge of Little Rann of Kachchh, the inner fort of Patdi, which is secured by dip water and city suburbs. Patdi is also known for its Surajmalji highschool.

Climate 
Due to the neighbouring "Desert", the climate is dry but not much different from other parts of Gujarat. Patdi was the first state in India which had electricity by private rajwadas.

References

Cities and towns in Surendranagar district
Taluka of Surendranagar